Cheryl Barton is an American landscape architect and founding principal of the San Francisco-based Office of Cheryl Barton. A Fellow and Past President of the American Society of Landscape Architects, she has completed a wide range of national and international projects in the US, Europe, Singapore, Abu Dhabi, and Bolivia. Her work includes national and local public parks, urban open spaces and master plans, cultural landscapes, college and institutional campuses, public art installations, corporate landscapes, and ecological master plans. Barton has received an Individual Fellowship from the National Endowment for the Arts and the Rome Prize in Landscape Architecture from the American Academy in Rome. She was featured in the 2012 documentary, Women in the Dirt.

Early life and training 
Cheryl Barton grew up in Erie, Pennsylvania. She received a bachelor's degree from Bucknell University in Fine Arts and Geology, and studied architecture and photography at the Boston Architectural Center. She received a master's degree in Landscape Architecture from the Harvard Graduate School of Design.

Design influences and philosophy 
Barton cites witnessing the devastation of Lake Erie as a young child as influential in her decision to pursue landscape architecture. While on a Charles Eliot Traveling Fellowship from Harvard University, Barton visited Temple of the Sun in Incayllacta, Bolivia; there she realized that the landscape "is a powerful medium of expression, a medium that can transform place and bridge cultures, and in so doing it can transform human values."  Barton also discusses the influence of the gardens of 17th century French landscape architect André Le Nôtre, of which she says: 'To see something deliberate and controlled juxtaposed with the unmanicured enhances the perception—and, I think, the appreciation or "seeing" of each. That is an experience I use constantly in my work: strong juxtapositions of the "natural" with "cultural interventions," which make people see, appreciate and, hopefully, care for their environments.'

Barton develops her philosophy of the integration of design and ecology and "landscape urbanism" further in a Boston Globe op-ed published in 2003 while she was a juror for the Rose Kennedy Greenway design competition: "Parks can be instrumental in solving larger urban and ecological or infrastructure problems, such as storm drainage, air quality, water supply, and the demolition (or construction) of expressways. If grounded in a regional ecology, parks can simultaneously accomplish social and environmental goals… Parks are expected to be much more than they have been at any time in the past. They are layered in meaning and richly stratified in function—something more than that experienced only through our eyes. They are powerful vehicles for reconnecting us to the land and to each other, and for enriching our very urban existence."

In an interview with the Landscape Architecture Foundation, Barton outlines two intentions driving her recent work:  a campaign Barton calls "Dirt is the New Water," which focuses on the "critical interrelationship between the soil and water that support the visible landscape"; and a concept for the long-term management of a site that Barton has called "Site Commissioning."

Career 
One of Barton's early jobs was in the office of modernist landscape architect Dan Kiley, whom she cites as influential in the development of her design philosophy and use of landscape intervention to heighten environmental awareness. Later positions Barton filled included Director of Landscape Architecture at Gresham Smith & Partners in Nashville, TN, from 1980 to 1985, and Principal and Design Studio Director of EDAW in San Francisco (now owned by AECOM) from 1986 to 1993.

Office of Cheryl Barton 
In 1994 Barton founded her own firm, Office of Cheryl Barton in San Francisco, CA.  Some of the firm's more well-known projects include landscapes at the Stanford Law School, The Gap Headquarters in San Francisco, the Rosie the Riveter Memorial, and Cavallo Point, a renovation of Fort Baker in Marin County, CA. The firm has increasingly become known for its focus on green infrastructure and landscape urbanism. In its Cavallo Point project, for example, the firm employed a nontraditional approach to planting design through harvesting seeds from the site which were then propagated in a local nursery, and planted as part of a landscape restoration plan.

Barton has often collaborated with artists including Elyn Zimmerman, Susan Schwartzenberg, Claes Oldenburg and Coosje Van Bruggen, Bruce Beasley, and Mark Mennin.

Professional civic engagement 
Barton has been involved in professional and civic organizations and initiatives focused on green urbanism. She is a fellow of the American Society of Landscape Architects (ASLA) and served as the Society's president from 1987 to 1988.  She has taught Sustainable Site Planning and Landscape Design workshops at the Pacific Energy Center in San Francisco. In 2003, Barton served on the design jury for the Rose Kennedy Greenway competition in Boston, MA.  Barton also serves on the Design Review Board of the San Francisco Bay Conservation and Development Commission.

Barton has been invited to speak nationally on her landscape architectural practice, with lectures at the Nevada Museum of Art and the NASA Research Park, as well as a wide range of academic institutions, including Stanford University, Pennsylvania State University, the University of San Francisco, and the University of Oregon.

Notable projects 
The Fields Park, Portland, OR

The Huntington Library, Art Collection and Botanical Gardens–Education and Visitor Center, San Marino, CA

Cavallo Point–The Retreat at Fort Baker, Sausalito, CA

University of Virginia South Lawn, Charlottesville, VA

Stanford Law School–William H. Neukom Building, Stanford, CA

Sutro Baths Historic District Urban Design Plan, San Francisco, CA

Constructing Memory: The Rosie the Riveter Memorial, Richmond, CA

Rincon Park, San Francisco, CA

Stanford University–The Anderson Collection Gallery, Stanford, CA

AT&T Park: Willie Mays Plaza and Streetscapes, San Francisco, CA

Stanford University–McMurtry Art and Art History Building, Stanford, CA

Palo Alto Medical Foundation–San Carlos Medical Center, San Carlos, CA

University of California, Berkeley–Hearst Greek Theater Master Plan, Berkeley, CA

Stanford University–Bing Concert Hall, Stanford, CA

California Shakespeare Theater, Orinda, CA

Gap Headquarters, San Francisco, CA

Yerba Buena Connector, San Francisco, CA

William and Flora Hewlett Foundation Headquarters, Menlo Park, CA

Stanford in Redwood City Master Plan, Redwood City, CA

University of California, Santa Cruz–Upper Quarry Amphitheater, Santa Cruz, CA

Treasure Island Cultural Park, San Francisco, CA

McNears Beach Park Master Plan, San Rafael, CA

Bay View Tech Campus, Mountain View, CA

Gap Urban Campus Headquarters, San Francisco, CA

Doris Duke Foundation for Islamic Arts, Honolulu, HI

Selected awards and recognition

Awards 
Cheryl Barton and her firm have received numerous awards for their projects. In 1983, Barton received an Individual Fellowship from the National Endowment for the Arts to study design restoration of derelict landscape. Barton is a Fellow if the American Academy in Rome, having been awarded the Rome Prize in Landscape Architecture in 2003. She was featured in the 2012 documentary, Women in the Dirt, along with 6 other prominent women landscape architects.

Janet Darling Webel Design Award, Harvard University

Charles Eliot Traveling Fellowship, Harvard University

1981 National Honor Award, ASLA, for Big South Fork National River and Recreation Area

1982 National Honor Award, ASLA, for Hampton Park

1983 Individual Fellowship, National Endowment for the Arts

1989 Best of Show, San Francisco Garden Show, for Garden on the Edge

1989 Award of Excellence, ASLA Northern California, for Garden on the Edge

1993 Excellence on the Waterfront Award, The Waterfront Center, for Sutro Historic District Urban Design Plan

1993 Award of Excellence, California Council ASLA, for Sutro Historic District Urban Design Plan

1993 National Honor Award, ASLA, Sutro Historic District Urban Design Plan

1994 First Place Demonstrated Sites, California Landscape Council, for Baylands Park

1994 Award of Excellence, California Parks and Recreation Society, for Baylands Park

2000 Honor Award, ASLA Northern California Chapter for Constructing Memory: The Rosie the Riveter Memorial

2000 Places Award, Environmental Design Research Association, for Constructing Memory: The Rosie the Riveter Memorial

2002 LEED Gold Certification, USGBC for Hewlett Foundation Headquarters

2003 Rome Prize in Landscape Architecture, American Academy in Rome,

2005 Design Award, California Preservation Foundation, for Bay Area Discovery Museum

2008 Top 10 New American Green Landmarks, Travel and Leisure Magazine, for Cavallo Point

2008 Timmy Award for Historic Rehabilitation, National Housing and Rehabilitation Association, for Cavallo Point

2009 Deal of the Year/Best Rehab Award, San Francisco Business Times Real Estate, for Cavallo Point

2009 California Governor's Award, for Cavallo Point

2009 Honor Award for Sustainable Design, National Trust for Historic Preservation, for Cavallo Point

2009 National Honor Award, ASLA, for The Gap Corporate Headquarters

2010 LEED Gold Certification, USGBC, for Cavallo Point

2010 Overall Sustainable Design Award, California Higher Education Sustainability Conference, for De Anza College Media and Learning Center

2010 Design Award for Historic Preservation, California Preservation Foundation, for The Walt Disney Family Museum

2010 Designing the Parks Honor Award, National Park Service, for Cavallo Point

2011 Design Merit Award, ASLA Oregon, for The Fields Park

2012 Design Merit Award, ASLA Northern California Chapter, for Stanford Law School William H. Neukom Building

2013 Craftsmanship/Preservation Technology Design Award, California Preservation Foundation, for the Hearst Greek Theater Rehabilitation

2013 American Architecture Award, Chicago Athenaeum, for Stanford University Bing Concert Hall

2014 Competition Winner, UC Santa Cruz Institute of Arts and Sciences Design Competition, (with Tod Williams Billie Tsien Architects + TEF Architects)

2014 Oregon Brownfields Award, for The Fields Park

2015 World Legacy Award for Place Making, National Geographic/ITB Berlin, for Cavallo Point

References 

 Amidon, Jane (2001). Radical Landscapes : Reinventing Outdoor Space (1. paperback edition 2003. ed.). London: Thames & Hudson. .
 "ARTS Park L.A.". Progressive Architecture. 1990. 
 Brookman, Donna (June 2001). "Memorial to Women's Labor". Sculpture 20 (5): 7. 
 "Constructing Memory". Landforum. 2001. 
 Dorrier, Jason (9 July 2013). "Google Shares Details of Futuristic New Office Park at NASA". Forbes. 
 Graves, Donna (Fall 2002). "Constructing Memory". Places / EDRA Places Awards 15 (1): 14–17. 
 Hawthorne, Christopher (14 January 2015). "Review: Huntington’s New Visitor Center Strikes Studiously Neutral Pose.". Los Angeles Times. 
 Hough, Mark (December 2011). "Studies in Contrast". Landscape Architecture Magazine 101 (12): 71–83. 
 John, Michael, ed. (1989). "Contemporary California Competitions". Urban Design International 10. 
 King, John (1 May 2013). "Davis: Design Chosen for Shrem Art Museum". San Francisco Chronicle. 
 "Making Artiface a Virtue". Landscape Architecture Magazine: 71. February 1990. 
 C-2. 
 Stephens, Suzanne. "Cavallo Point, The Retreat at the Golden Gate". Architectural Record. 
 Stott, Rory. "Tod Williams & Billie Tsien Selected for New UCSC Institute of Arts and Sciences". Arch Daily. 
 "Sutro Historic District". Landscape Architecture Magazine 83 (11): 61. November 1993. 
 "Sutro Historic District". PROCESS Architecture: 26. September 1994.

External links 
 Office of Cheryl Barton Profile

American landscape architects
Women landscape architects
Living people
Harvard Graduate School of Design alumni
Year of birth missing (living people)
Artists from Erie, Pennsylvania
Bucknell University alumni
Architects from San Francisco
Boston Architectural College alumni